To Live (Italian: Vivere!) is a 1937 Italian musical drama film directed by Guido Brignone and starring Tito Schipa, Caterina Boratto and Nino Besozzi. The film is noted for its title song, composed by Cesare A. Bixio. It was distributed by the Italian subsidiary of MGM.

Cast

References

Bibliography 
 Moliterno, Gino. Historical Dictionary of Italian Cinema. Scarecrow Press, 2008.

External links 

1937 films
1930s musical drama films
1930s Italian-language films
Films directed by Guido Brignone
Italian black-and-white films
Italian musical drama films
1937 drama films
1930s Italian films